The Reeveston Place Historic District is a neighborhood of homes and national historic district located at Richmond, Wayne County, Indiana.  It was platted in 1911 on land formerly owned by the family of Mark Reeves and the district encompasses 218 contributing buildings, 1 contributing site, and 2 contributing objects. The architecture is an eclectic mix of styles including Craftsman and English cottages, and impressive homes in the Colonial Revival, Tudor Revival, Georgian, French, Spanish and Ranch styles.  The original  Reeves home in the Second Empire style survives as well.

The proper borders of the Reeveston area are South B Street to the north, South 23rd Street to the east, South 16th Street to the west and South E Street to the south.  However, the northeast corner of South E and South 16th is not a part of the original Reeves property - the house located there predates the Reeves home.

The district was added to the National Register of Historic Places in 2003.

See also 

 Old Richmond Historic District
 Starr Historic District
 Richmond Railroad Station Historic District
 East Main Street-Glen Miller Park Historic District
 Richmond Downtown Historic District

References

Historic districts on the National Register of Historic Places in Indiana
Second Empire architecture in Indiana
Colonial Revival architecture in Indiana
Tudor Revival architecture in Indiana
Mission Revival architecture in Indiana
Geography of Wayne County, Indiana
Historic districts in Richmond, Indiana
National Register of Historic Places in Wayne County, Indiana